Shreela Flather, Baroness Flather DL (born 13 February 1934) is a British-Indian politician, teacher and life peer.

Politics
Flather served as a Councillor from 1976 to 1991; as Deputy Mayor and as Mayor for the Royal Borough of Windsor and Maidenhead; and as a Justice of the peace from 1971 to 1990. She became a life peer for the Conservative party on 11 June 1990 as Baroness Flather, of Windsor and Maidenhead in the Royal County of Berkshire. She was the first Asian woman to receive a peerage. In 1998 she resigned as the Conservative whip over the demotion of Viscount Cranborne for his actions to reduce the impact of the 1999 House of Lords Act. She rejoined the party in 1999, but left a second time in 2008, since when she has sat as a crossbencher.

Flather attended University College London. She has served as Deputy Mayor and as Mayor for the Royal Borough of Windsor and Maidenhead.

She has also been a teacher of English as a second language and a member of the Conservative Women's National Committee. Flather has been recognised as Asian of the Year 1996. She has served senior posts in various organisations involved in refugee, community, race relations and prison work. She was also shortlisted for the Grassroot Diplomat Initiative Award in 2015 for her outspoken work on women's rights, and she remains in the directory of the Grassroot Diplomat Who's Who publication.

As a member of the House of Lords, she gained attention for wearing a sari and for being among the first ethnic minorities in the house.

Flather is a distinguished supporter of Humanists UK and an honorary associate of the National Secular Society. She is one of the Vice Chairs of the All-Party Parliamentary Humanist Group. She lives in Maidenhead.

She is patron of the UK population concern charity, Population Matters. she has been a board member of Marie Stopes for 17 years.

Her most important contribution has been to help create a memorial to the volunteers from the Indian Subcontinent, Africa and the Caribbean who fought with the British in two World Wars.  These volunteers who number nearly 5 million had all but been forgotten.  Her own father volunteered in the First World War and was a stretcher bearer in Mesopotamia.  The Memorial Gates stand on Constitution Hill near Hyde Park Corner.

In September 2011 during a Parliamentary debate on welfare, she singled out Bangladeshi and Pakistani immigrant communities in the United Kingdom and accused them having a large number of children in order to be able to claim welfare benefits. She claimed the issue did not apply to British families of Indian origin as they “they are like the Jews of old. They want their children to be educated.”  Her comments were not well-received by the government. Labour Party MP Michael Dugher later condemned her and said that her views were “ignorant” and unacceptable - she later admitted that her statement had “gone too far.”

Flather made further controversial comments in November 2012, when she defended Conservative election strategist Lynton Crosby, during an incident where he used an offensive term referring to Muslims at a meeting when he was working for Mayor of London, Boris Johnson. She said: "I don’t condone swearing, but Lynton is right to say it is pointless for the Conservatives to chase Muslim votes. They are all on benefits and all vote Labour."

In 2015 she again was accused of bigotry for implying that consanguineous marriages, which are common in India and account for up to 23% of marriages in South India, were uniquely problematic in the Pakistani community. She also called for a ban of Halal meats in the UK.

Religious views
Flather has described herself as a "Hindu atheist". Broadly, she is an atheist with affinity to the most important sayings from the Bhagavad Gita and following them. She is an honorary associate of the National Secular Society.

Honours
Honorary Doctor of Laws Leeds University, Honorary Doctor of the Open University and Northampton University.  Fellow University College London.

Award

Family and personal life
Daughter of Rai Bahadur Aftab Rai, of New Delhi, India, a barrister and diplomat, and Krishna Rai, Flather is the great-granddaughter of Sir Ganga Ram, a noted engineer, philanthropist and agriculturist  during the late 19th century and early 20th century in Punjab, British India (now Pakistan). She was married to Gary Denis Flather until his death in 2017. She has two sons from her previous marriage one of whom is Paul Flather. The Baroness' niece is Kesha Ram, a member of the Vermont State Senate.

Books
Woman Acceptable Exploitation For Profit (2010)

Arms

References

External links
 
Dharma-Has It Impacted The UK Political Scene? Hinduism Today - April 1995
Hansard records

1934 births
Living people
Alumni of University College London
British people of Indian descent
British people of Punjabi descent
British Hindus
British atheists
British humanists
British politicians of Indian descent
British politicians of Punjabi descent
British secularists
Conservative Party (UK) life peers
Councillors in Berkshire
Deputy Lieutenants of Berkshire
Life peeresses created by Elizabeth II
Women councillors in England
Recipients of Pravasi Bharatiya Samman